The 2022 Pac-12 Football Championship Game was a college football game played on December 2, 2022, at Allegiant Stadium in the Las Vegas-area community of Paradise, Nevada. It was the 12th edition of the Pac-12 Football Championship Game, and determined the champion of the Pac-12 Conference for the 2022 season. The game began at 5:00 p.m. PST and aired on Fox. The contest featured the USC Trojans, the team with the best conference record, and the Utah Utes, the team with the second best conference record. Sponsored by gas station chain 76, the game will officially be known as the 2022 Pac-12 Football Championship Game presented by 76. 

This was the first Pac-12 Football Championship Game to not feature the champions of the North and South Division. The Pac-12 got rid of its divisions following the NCAA Division 1 Council's ruling that conferences could determine the teams participating in its championship game. Utah became the third team in the Conference Championship era to repeat at Pac 12 champions.

Previous season

The 2021 Pac-12 Championship Game featured Oregon against Utah. In the championship game, Utah was victorious by a score of 38-10, winning its first Pac-12 championship.

Teams

USC Trojans

The Trojans clinched a spot in the championship game following its defeat of UCLA on November 19.

Utah Utes

Going into the final week of the conference season (weekend of November 26), the Oregon Ducks, Washington Huskies and Utah Utes were in contention to face USC in the championship game.

Oregon lost 38–34 at Oregon State, leaving the Ducks dependent on a Washington State win to make the title game. Utah, which remained alive going into Saturday's games thanks to UCLA defeating California 35–28 on November 25, defeated Colorado 63–21, eliminating Washington from contention and putting the Utes in position to advance to the title game with a Washington win. With Washington’s 51–33 win over Washington State, Utah clinched the second spot to the game. Utah won its first back-to-back conference championship since 2003 and 2004.

Game summary

Scoring summary

Impact 
The loss ultimately led to USC missing the playoffs, dropping to #10 in the final CFP rankings, letting Ohio State slip in as the #4 seed in the final rankings.

Statistics
Team statistics

See also
 List of Pac-12 Conference football champions

References

Championship
Pac-12 Football Championship Game
USC Trojans football games
Utah Utes football games
Sports competitions in Nevada
Pac-12 Football
Pac-12 Football